Bronwyn Halfpenny (born 30 July 1963) is an Australian politician, and has been the member for Thomastown in the Victorian Legislative Assembly since 2010.

She is the daughter of the well-known trade union leader John Halfpenny and grew up in the Melbourne suburb of Watsonia. She was educated at Watsonia Primary School, Watsonia High School and La Trobe University, from which she graduated with a Bachelor of Economics.

Prior to her election to the Victorian state parliament, Halfpenny was the secretary of the Food and Confectionery Division of the Australian Manufacturing Workers Union from 1999 to 2006, and Industrial Campaigns Officer of the Victorian Trades Hall Council from 2006 to 2010.

She lives in the northern suburbs of Melbourne and has two children.

References

External links
 Parliamentary voting record of Bronwyn Halfpenny at Victorian Parliament Tracker

1963 births
Living people
Australian Labor Party members of the Parliament of Victoria
Members of the Victorian Legislative Assembly
Flinders University alumni
La Trobe University alumni
21st-century Australian politicians
21st-century Australian women politicians
Women members of the Victorian Legislative Assembly
People from the City of Banyule
Politicians from Melbourne